Gauthier Boccard (born 26 August 1991) is a Belgian field hockey player who plays as a defender or midfielder for Léopold and the Belgian national team.

Club career
In the 2018–19 Euro Hockey League, Boccard's Waterloo Ducks became the first Belgian club to win the Euro Hockey League. He also won three national title with the Waterloo Ducks. In March 2022 he signed a four year contract at Royal Léopold Club from the summer of 2022 onwards.

International career
At the 2012 Summer Olympics, he competed for the national team in the men's tournament. Gauthier Boccard also participated with the Belgium men's national field hockey team at the 2016 Summer Olympics in Rio. The Belgian Red Lions made an impression during these Games, winning the silver medal, and Gauthier Boccard scored one goal. He was a part of the Belgian squad which won Belgium its first World Cup and European title. On 25 May 2021, he was selected in the squad for the 2021 EuroHockey Championship.  He was also part of the Belgian squad that won the gold medal at the delayed 2020 Olympics.

Honours

Waterloo Ducks
 Euro Hockey League: 2018–19
 Belgian Hockey League: 2011–12, 2012–13, 2013–14

Belgium
 Olympic gold medal: 2020
 Olympic silver medal: 2016
 World Cup: 2018
 EuroHockey Championship: 2019
 FIH Pro League: 2020–21

References

External links
 
 
 
 

1991 births
Living people
People from Uccle
Belgian male field hockey players
Male field hockey defenders
Male field hockey midfielders
Field hockey players at the 2012 Summer Olympics
Field hockey players at the 2016 Summer Olympics
Field hockey players at the 2020 Summer Olympics
2018 Men's Hockey World Cup players
Olympic field hockey players of Belgium
Olympic silver medalists for Belgium
Olympic medalists in field hockey
Medalists at the 2016 Summer Olympics
Waterloo Ducks H.C. players
Men's Belgian Hockey League players
Olympic gold medalists for Belgium
Medalists at the 2020 Summer Olympics
Royal Léopold Club players
Field hockey players from Brussels
2023 Men's FIH Hockey World Cup players